Seyyed Ali may refer to:

Seyyed Ali, East Azerbaijan
Seyyed Ali, Khuzestan
Seyyed Ali, Lorestan (disambiguation)
Seyyed Ali, Delfan
Seyyed Ali, Kakavand
Seyyed Ali-ye Kiasoltan, Mazandaran Province
Seyyed Ali, South Khorasan